Letter from Masanjia is a Canadian documentary film, directed by Leon Lee and released in 2018. The film profiles the case of Sun Yi, a Chinese Falun Gong practitioner turned political prisoner who was responsible for exposing significant human rights abuses at the Masanjia Labor Camp when his letter was found by Oregon resident Julie Keith in a box of Halloween decorations, and made headlines worldwide. The discovery of this letter and the subsequent wide coverage by news agencies in part led to China announcing major reforms, and the abolishment of the labor camp system.

The film premiered on April 27, 2018, at the Hot Docs Canadian International Documentary Festival.

The film received a Canadian Screen Award nomination for Best Feature Length Documentary at the 7th Canadian Screen Awards in 2019.

The film met with high praise. On Rotten Tomatoes it has an approval rating of  based on reviews from  critics.

References

External links
 

2018 films
2018 documentary films
Canadian documentary films
Canadian prison films
2010s English-language films
2010s Canadian films